The 1965 San Francisco 49ers season was the franchise's 16th season in the National Football League and their 20th overall. They improved on their 4–10 record from 1964, and finished 7–6–1. However, they failed to qualify for the playoffs for the eighth consecutive season.

The team was coached by Jack Christiansen, a former defensive back from Colorado State, who had an 8-year career as a player in the NFL and was inducted into the Pro Football Hall of Fame as a player in 1970. As the coach of the 49ers from 1963 to 1967, he experienced his highest winning percentage in 1965, with a W–L% of .538. He was unable to make the playoffs in any of his 5 years as coach.

Regular Season Analysis 
The 1965 San Francisco 49ers were 1st of 14 in the league in Points For, averaging 30.1 points per game. Despite offensive success, they were unable to overcome defensive struggles, ranking 13th of 14 in Points Against, averaging 28.7 points per game.

With John Brodie playing quarterback, the 49ers' 1965 season had high expectations from around the league.

The 49ers had a strong QB–WR duo in John Brodie and Dave Parks, with a lethal playmaking ability that many compared to Joe Montana and Jerry Rice. The 49ers' first draft pick, Ken Willard, proved to be the 49ers' leading rusher with 778 yards in his rookie campaign. He averaged a dominant 4.1 yards per carry, which placed him 4th in the NFL at that time. 

The 49ers started the season with a 52–24 win against the Chicago Bears at home. They highlighted much of what the public expected from their offense. The following week, the 49ers won their second straight home game to start the season 2–0 after beating the Pittsburgh Steelers 27–17.

The 49ers lost their first game on October 3rd against the Baltimore Colts despite a career day for Parks, who totaled 231 receiving yards and 3 touchdowns from 9 receptions.

The 49ers lost back-to-back games, taking a 10–27 loss against the Vince Lombardi-led Green Bay Packers in Lambeau Field, a team that would win the 1965 NFL Championship Game against the Cleveland Browns.

The 49ers rallied back after two straight losses to pick up a colossal win against the Los Angeles Rams in the Los Angeles Memorial Colosseum, winning 45–21 behind three passing touchdowns from Brodie.

On October 24th, the lack of emphasis on defense led to a disappointing loss to the Minnesota Vikings at home. Despite leading by as much as 21 points, the 49ers defense was unable to protect the lead and dropped their 3rd game in 4 weeks after losing 41–42. A team with all the offensive firepower in the world was beginning to slip up.

The 49ers proceeded to lose their next two games as their defense continued to struggle. Despite averaging around 33 points through their first 6 games, their defense was unable to hold up against the Baltimore Colts and the Dallas Cowboys. The 49ers lost 28–34 to the Colts at home, and lost 31–39 to the Cowboys on the road. The 49ers disappointingly fell to 3–5 despite statistically having the league's best offense.

On the road against the Detroit Lions, the 49ers picked up a huge win thanks to a 75-yard fumble recovery for a touchdown by defensive end Clark Miller. The 27–21 victory was the start of a huge late-season surge as the 49ers began looking ahead to a potential playoffs berth despite the three straight losses.

On November 21st, the San Francisco 49ers hosted the Los Angeles Rams in what turned out to be a thrilling conference matchup decided by a 22-yard game-winning field goal from Tommy Davis. The 49ers won 30–27 and once again had hope for a postseason berth as they posted an even 5–5 record with four crucial matchups remaining.

John Brodie made a swift recovery from his injured shoulder, tossing a career-high five passing touchdowns and scoring 45 points on offense in a revenge win from their loss to Minnesota earlier in the season. The 49ers picked up a huge win at home the following week, beating the Detroit Lions 17–14 and putting themselves in position to make the playoffs.

The 49ers' playoff hopes came to a disappointing end after the team was destroyed at Wrigley Field by the Chicago Bears, losing 61–20 as Gale Sayers scored an NFL-record 6 touchdowns in the blowout. The 49ers proceeded to tie the Green Bay Packers the following week to finish their inconsistent season 7–6–1.

Offseason

NFL Draft
The San Francisco 49ers had the 2nd overall pick in the 1965 NFL Draft. Although 20 players were drafted, only 13 would suit up and play an NFL game. Picks from the first ten rounds are shown below.

Regular season schedule

Schedule

Standings

Awards, records, and honors
The 1965 San Francisco 49ers had 4 Pro Bowlers and 1 First Team All-Pro players.

John Brodie - Pro Bowl Selection

Ken Willard - Pro Bowl Selection

John David Crow - Pro Bowl Selection

Dave Parks - Pro Bowl Selection, First Team All-Pro

Bibliography 

 Newhouse, Dave (2015). Founding 49ers: The Dark Days before the Dynasty. The Kent State University Press. pp. 130–133.
 This book written by Dave Newhouse provides an analysis of the San Francisco 49ers throughout different eras. Goes into detail regarding the culture and experiences throughout the 1965 NFL season.
Schudel, Jeff (2021). "56 years ago, Browns lost 1965 NFL championship to Packers in Lambeau quagmire". The News-Herald.
Offers perspective of talent and performance from the 1965 NFL season. The Green Bay Packers played the San Francisco 49ers on Dec. 19, 1965 and tied 24–24, resulting in a 7–6–1 finish for the 49ers.

Provides in-depth analysis of statistics, as well as performance. Details weekly statistics as well as player accolades

Offers valuable insight on Ken Willard's rookie season from 1965, as well as additional context to his season. His role was very important to the offensive success of the 49ers that season.

References

External links
 1965 49ers on Pro Football Reference
 49ers Schedule on jt-sw.com

San Francisco 49ers seasons
San Francisco 49ers
San Fran
San Fran 49